Zheng Wu (born 7 August 1967) is a Chinese former basketball player who competed in the 1996 Summer Olympics and in the 2000 Summer Olympics.

References

1967 births
Living people
Basketball players from Zhejiang
Chinese men's basketball players
Sportspeople from Hangzhou
Olympic basketball players of China
Basketball players at the 1996 Summer Olympics
Basketball players at the 2000 Summer Olympics
Asian Games medalists in basketball
Asian Games gold medalists for China
Basketball players at the 1994 Asian Games
Medalists at the 1994 Asian Games
1994 FIBA World Championship players